Private Number is a 1936 American drama film directed by Roy Del Ruth and starring Loretta Young, Robert Taylor and Basil Rathbone. Sometimes known by the alternative title of Secret Interlude, the film was based on the play Common Clay by Cleves Kinkead which had previously been made into a film of the same name in 1930. Following the more rigorous enforcement of the Motion Picture Production Code after 1934, many of the more salacious elements of the earlier film were left out.

Plot
Ellen Neal is a 17-year-old girl looking for a job as a servant when she arrives at the home of the wealthy Winfield family. There, she meets servant Gracie who sets up an interview between her and the family's butler, Thomas Wroxton. Wroxton rules the household staff like a tyrant, demanding a large cut of their weekly wages as his "commission". Despite Ellen having no experience, he finds her attractive, so he agrees to give her a month's trial of work and tells her she must report to him only. She leaves, uncomfortable, but Gracie convinces her to stay. Ellen then meets Mrs. Winfield and charms her so much that she is asked to become her personal maid.

The Winfield's son, Richard returns home from college and meets Ellen at a party. He has no clue that she is a servant. Later, Gracie and her boyfriend Smiley take Ellen on a double date, setting her up with a blind date. A riot breaks out after an argument arises amongst the men. Ellen flees and meets Coakley, a man she had just met before the date, who is willing to give her a ride home. He takes her to his place, but both are arrested after the police raid the house due to a notice made about illegal gambling occurring. Wraxton bails her out of jail.

On a family trip to Maine, Ellen finds out that Richard is set to marry another woman. Despite this, Richard tells her that she is his only romantic interest and that he doesn't care that she is a servant. He suggests they marry, but she thinks it would be a mistake. Later, Wroxton asks Ellen to marry him, admitting he watches every move she makes. She rejects him and he catches on to her relationship with Richard. A fellow servant tells him that she knows Ellen is pregnant and has secretly married Richard. A vengeful Wroxton immediately tells the Winfields about the pregnancy. Mr. Winfield wants to terminate her employment, but Mrs. Winfield expresses how much she likes Ellen. They want more information from Ellen, but Gracie arrives and blurts out that Ellen and Richard are married. They all start to argue and Wroxton informs them about Ellen’s arrest. Frustrated, Ellen storms out without taking any money offered from the family and confirms that she is pregnant. When Richard finds out that Ellen has left, he searches for her while Wroxton and Mr. Winfield agree to ignore any possible mail that might come from her in the future.

Ellen has her baby alone and lives on a farm now. Gracie and Smiley come to visit her, but two men show up and hand her a letter detailing how Richard wants to annul their marriage on grounds of fraud. Smiley calls over his attorney Stapp who says they must first verify that Ellen is indeed married to Richard. Meanwhile, Richard has no clue the letter exists since it was sent by his family without his knowledge. Mr. Winfield shows Richard that Ellen is paying for an apartment and is spending large sums of money in his name as Mrs. Winfield, furthering their suspicion that she is a gold digger. The whole scandal is sensationalized in the local newspaper. Richard finds Ellen and he signs the annulment papers after realizing that she had in fact been arrested before. Stapp prepares Coakley as their witness. Ellen testifies that she is not a gold digger and that she just loves Richard and wants to protect their baby. To Ellen and Stapp’s shock, Coakley is called by the prosecutor as a witness. He lies about what happened the night she was arrested and it is insinuated that he slept with her when she was underage. Stapp calls for him to be arrested on the spot. Panicked, Coakley and the prosecution team meet and it is revealed that Wroxton paid him to switch sides and to lie for his testimony. Richard punches Wroxton and asks the court to throw out the case. He then gives a speech about how much he loves Ellen and that he believed she was innocent the entire time. The couple are finally reconciled.

Cast
 Loretta Young as Ellen Neal 
 Robert Taylor as Richard Winfield 
 Basil Rathbone as Thomas Wroxton 
 Patsy Kelly as Gracie 
 Joe E. Lewis as Smiley Watson 
 Marjorie Gateson as Mrs. Maggie Winfield 
 Paul Harvey as  Perry Winfield 
 Jane Darwell as Mrs. Meecham 
 Paul Stanton as Rawlings 
 John Miljan as Sam Stapp 
 Monroe Owsley as James Coakley 
 Billy Bevan as Frederick 
 George Irving as Judge 
 May Beatty as Grandma Gammon

Reception 
Reviews of the film are mixed. Motion Picture Reviews said the film "is entertaining only because it is a vehicle for the ascendant Robert Taylor and lovely Loretta Young, but it chalks up nothing on their scores because it is intrinsically trashy. Motives are confused, situations forced, direction not remarkable".

However, The Hollywood Reporter deemed it "a love story that hits romantic high for the year, bringing together as a modern Cinderella and her prince, Loretta Young and Robert Taylor... The combination spells box office returns in the smash category. Its appeal is especially to women, who will give it unlimited word-of-mouth boosting, but it is candy entertainment for any man with a spark of romance in his make-up".

The Motion Picture Daily simply said "This is typical Hollywood fare..." and Variety called it "solid entertainment for the masses".

References

Bibliography
 Bernstein, Matthew. Controlling Hollywood: Censorship and Regulation in the Studio Era. Athlone Press, 2000.

External links

1936 films
American romantic drama films
1930s English-language films
Films directed by Roy Del Ruth
American films based on plays
American black-and-white films
Films scored by Cyril J. Mockridge
20th Century Fox films
1936 romantic drama films
1930s American films